Anne-Sophie Lavoine (born 20 June 1981) is a French rhythmic gymnast. She represented France at the Olympic Games in 2000

Career 
In 2000 Lavoine was part of the French group that competed at the Olympic Games held in Sydney, Australia. They scored 37.900 points in the qualifying round with teammates Anna-Sofie Doyen, Anne-Laure Klein, Magalie Poisson, Laetitia Mancieri and Vanessa Sauzede. They finished in ninth place after qualification, not managing to reach the final.

References

External links

1981 births
Living people
French rhythmic gymnasts
Olympic gymnasts of France
Gymnasts at the 2000 Summer Olympics